Dr. Zonk and the Zunkins was a CBC children's television series which ran three afternoons a week from 23 September 1974 to 14 April 1975.

Although the show was cancelled after one season, it was notable for the number of cast members who went on to successful careers. Some of the cast members were also seen in the following season on the CBC Television series Coming Up Rosie.

Cast 
John Candy
Robin Eveson (as Billy Meek)
Dan Hennessey
Bob McKenna
Rosemary Radcliffe
Gilda Radner
Fiona Reid
John Stocker

Premise 
The show centered on scenes set in the bedroom of a young boy named Billy Meek with robot/computer-like puppets called Zunkins named Zooey and Dunkin who would come to life each episode out of a comic book featuring the adventures of the never seen superhero Dr. Zonk. The rest of the cast were featured in randomly themed comedy sketches that the Zunkins would show to their human friend.

Reception 
A survey of 600 potential viewers found that the series was deemed childish and that viewership was being lost to competing American sitcoms. This led the producers to feature several of the performers in an entirely new series, Coming Up Rosie, based on a more conventional sitcom concept.

References

External links 
 Queen's University Directory of CBC Television Series (Dr. Zonk and the Zunkins archived listing link via archive.org)

1974 Canadian television series debuts
1975 Canadian television series endings
CBC Television original programming
Canadian television shows featuring puppetry
1970s Canadian children's television series